Dwight Brigham Harwood  (April 29, 1892 – August 8, 1965) was an American football and basketball coach. He was the head football coach at Hillsdale College in Hillsdale, Michigan for 19 seasons, from 1927 until 1945, compiling a record of 68–53–14. Harwood also served two stints as the head basketball coach at Hillsdale, from 1926 to 1934 and 1940 to 1946, tallying a mark of 60–104.

Harwood graduated from Hillsdale in 1914. He died of a heart attack in 1965 at the age of 73.

Head coaching record

Football

References

1892 births
1965 deaths
Basketball coaches from Michigan
Hillsdale Chargers football coaches
Hillsdale Chargers men's basketball coaches
Hillsdale College alumni
People from Plainwell, Michigan